Suchilquitongo may refer to:

Suchilquitongo (archaeological site)
Santiago Suchilquitongo (town and municipality)
Suchilquitongo Formation